The Fiat 8 hp is a car produced by the Italian manufacturer Fiat in 1901.

References

8 HP
Cars introduced in 1901
1900s cars
Veteran vehicles